Chacarita Airport  is an airport serving the town of Chacarita in Puntarenas Province, Costa Rica. Chacarita is on the Pacific coast at the base of the Puntarenas peninsula, just east of Puntarenas city.

See also

 Transport in Costa Rica
 List of airports in Costa Rica

References

External links
 OurAirports - Chacarita Airport
 OpenStreetMap - Chacarita
 HERE Maps - Chacarita
 FallingRain - Chacarita Airport
 

Airports in Costa Rica
Puntarenas Province